The Sperry Messenger was an American single-seat biplane designed by Alfred V. Verville working for the Engineering Division of the United States Army Air Service (USAAS) and built under contract by Sperry Aircraft Company of Farmingdale, New York. The aircraft was later designated the M-1 and MAT by the USAAS.  Sperry produced approximately 50 Messengers and the civilian two-seat version, the Sport Plane, between 1920 and 1926. The aircraft was the first to make contact between an airplane and an airship while in flight.

Development
In 1921 Alfred V. Verville led the Engineering Division of the USAAS's design of a simple single-seat biplane to be used as a messenger aircraft to replace motorcycles. The aircraft was built by the Sperry Aircraft Company as the Sperry Messenger. The Messenger was a conventional biplane with a fixed tailskid landing gear and a nose-mounted 60 hp (45 kW) Lawrance L-4 radial engine. In 1924 the military aircraft were given USAAS designations M-1, M-1A and MAT. Lawrence Sperry gained attention when he landed his personal Messenger in front of the Capitol building and bounced up the front steps in Washington D.C. (See photo below.) He also successfully landed his little Messenger at the Lincoln Memorial. The prototype was used by Lawrence Sperry who disappeared in 1923, flying a Messenger across the English Channel from France to England.

Operational history
The Messenger's small size, simple construction, and inexpensive cost made it ideal for testing and experimentation.  As well as the original communications duties, the National Advisory Committee for Aeronautics used one in its pioneering aerodynamic research programs from 1923 to 1929.  Sperry modified twelve into the radio-controlled Messenger Aerial Torpedo, an early flying bomb, and developed the apparatus for a Messenger to make the first successful airship hook on and release in December 1924. On December 15, at Scott Field, Illinois, Lt. Clyde Finter hooked on to a trapeze attached to a non-rigid airship, the TC-3. In the Messenger, Finter remained attached briefly while the airship made a turn, then he unhooked and landed the aircraft on the ground.

Variants

Messenger
Sperry designation, 42 built later given USAAS designations M-1, M-1A and MAT.
M-1
Messengers used in communications duties, 26 built and known by the USAAS as the Verville-Sperry M-1
M-1A
Messengers with increased fuel capacity, 16 built.
MAT
Messengers used as aerial torpedoes (Messenger Aerial Torpedo), eight conversions.

Operators

United States Army Air Service

Specifications (M-1)

Gallery

See also

References
Notes

Bibliography

External links

 Cradle of Aviation Museum
 NASA History Publication (see section titled The Case of the Sperry Messenger)

1920s United States military utility aircraft
Verville aircraft
Messenger
Single-engined tractor aircraft
Biplanes
Aircraft first flown in 1921
Parasite aircraft